Juan Vázquez may refer to:

Juan Bautista Vázquez (1510–1588), Spanish sculptor and painter of the Renaissance period
Juan Vázquez de Mella (1861–1928), Spanish politician known for his rhetorical power
Juan T. Vázquez Martín (1941-2017), Cuban abstract painter who lived and worked in Havana
Juan Vázquez de Coronado (1523–1565), Spanish conquistador and first Governor of Costa Rica
Juan Vásquez (composer) (c. 1500–c. 1560), Spanish composer, surname also spelled Vázquez
Juan Vázquez Terreiro (1912–1957), Spanish international footballer
Juan Vázquez García (born 1952), Spanish economist

See also
Juan Vasquez (disambiguation)